Phale Dolphis Hale (July 16, 1914 – May 29, 2009) was a member of the Ohio House of Representatives.

He is interred at Green Lawn Cemetery  in Columbus, Ohio.

References

Democratic Party members of the Ohio House of Representatives
1914 births
2009 deaths
20th-century American politicians
Hale